In association with fever production, decreased food consumption is a common sign of infection. Infection-induced anorexia (IIA) performs a vital function during an infection. That is, anorexia is an active defence mechanism that is beneficial for host defence. IIA is a behaviour systematically organised for pathogen elimination. During infection-induced anorexia, autophagic flux is upregulated systemically. A decrease in serum amino acids during an infection promotes autophagy not only in immune cells, but also in nonimmune cells. Augmented autophagic responses may play a critical role in clearing pathogens (xenophagy), in the presentation of epitopes in nonprovisional antigen presenting cells and the removal of damaged proteins and organelles, and recycling these damaged proteins, organelles and pathogens as source of nutrition.

References

Anorexia nervosa